The Purnell School was a progressive private all-girls boarding high school located in Pottersville, within Bedminster, New Jersey, about an hour and one-half west of New York City, and two hours north of Philadelphia.
Purnell School was a member of the New Jersey Association of Independent Schools. The school was accredited in 1973 by the Middle States Association of Colleges and Schools Commission on Secondary Schools. The school officially closed following the 2020-21 academic school year citing "“challenges related to the competitive landscape’’.

As of the 2017–18 school year, the school had an enrollment of 57 students and 15 classroom teachers (on an FTE basis), for a student–teacher ratio of 3.8:1. The school's student body was 61.4% (35) White, 26.3% (15) Black, 7.0% (4) Hispanic and 5.3% (3) Asian.

History

In December 1963, Purnell was established as a not-for-profit corporation by: Lytt Gould, President, Sis Gould, Secretary, Hap Johnson, Treasurer, and Ethel Stringfellow as the corporation's original Vice President. Carroll's contacts within the Bernardsville community led to the purchase of the  Bassett Farm in Pottersville.

After renovations, primarily by the Gould family, the Founders and their friends, began recruiting the first students to Purnell. The new Headmaster hired eight teachers.

In September 1965, Headmaster Lytt Gould and Associate Head Sis Gould greeted the first entering class of 18 student and Purnell celebrated its first graduation in June 1968.

Today Purnell has over 1,375 alumnae.

On February 16, 2021, the Purnell School board of trustees announced their decision that Purnell would cease operations on June 30, 2021.

In June of 2021, the Pingry School announced the acquisition of the Purnell School campus.

Academics

Graduation requirements included 4 years of English, 3 years of math, science and history, 2 years of foreign language, and classes in performing and studio arts.

In addition to traditional classes, students also participated in the Affinities Program, as an additional class and a set of seminars designed to help students find and use their strengths.

Each February, traditional classes were suspended and the school had Project Exploration, a mini-term during which students chose one class to focus on for the entire three-week period.  Project Exploration courses have included trips to France, Mexico, Costa Rica, the school's musical production, Culinary Arts, Mass Media, Equine Studies, Animals and Society, Maritime Studies, Interior Design, and many more.

Athletics

Purnell offered a variety of competitive and non-competitive sports throughout the year. Competitive sports included soccer, volleyball, tennis, dance synthesis, basketball, lacrosse and softball. Non-competitive sports included horseback riding, circuit training, dance sport, personal conditioning, yoga and golf.

Purnell competed in the New Jersey Association of Independent Schools Athletic Association - Division B

Arts

The Johnson Art Center hosted classes in drawing, collage, pastels, ceramics, photography, oil painting and fashion design.

The Carney Center for Performing Arts was a 179-seat theater. Student performing groups included Ad-libbers, Dance Synthesis, and Shoots and Strawberries, the choral group.

References

External links

1963 establishments in New Jersey
Boarding schools in New Jersey
Educational institutions established in 1963
Girls' schools in New Jersey
Middle States Commission on Secondary Schools
Private high schools in Somerset County, New Jersey
Bedminster, New Jersey